Archips symmetrus is a species of moth of the family Tortricidae. It is found in the Republic of the Congo and the Democratic Republic of the Congo.

References

Moths described in 1918
Archips
Moths of Africa